Saurita lasiphlebia is a moth in the subfamily Arctiinae. It was described by Paul Dognin in 1906. It is found in Peru.

References

Natural History Museum Lepidoptera generic names catalog

Moths described in 1906
Saurita